This is a list of transfers in Serbian football for the 2017–18 winter transfer window.
 Moves featuring Serbian SuperLiga and Serbian First League sides are listed.
 The order by which the clubs are listed is equal to the classifications at the end of the first part of the 2017–18 season.

Serbian SuperLiga

Red Star Belgrade

In:

Out:

Partizan

In:

Out:

Spartak Subotica

In:

Out:

Radnički Niš

In:

Out:

Čukarički

In:

Out:

Voždovac

In:

Out:

Napredak Kruševac

In:

Out:

Vojvodina

In:

Out:

Mladost Lučani

In:

Out:

Radnik Surdulica

In:

Out:

Mačva Šabac

In:

Out:

Zemun

In:

Out:

Bačka BP

In:

Out:

Borac Čačak

In:

Out:

Javor Ivanjica

In:

Out:

Rad

In:

Out:

Serbian First League

Dinamo Vranje

In:

Out:

Metalac G. M.

In:

Out:

Proleter Novi Sad

In:

Out:

TSC Bačka Topola

In:

Out:

Sinđelić Beograd

In:

Out:

Radnički Kragujevac

In:

Out:

Inđija

In:

Out:

Novi Pazar

In:

Out:

Sloboda Užice

In:

Out:

Budućnost Dobanovci

In:

Out:

ČSK Čelarevo

In:

Out:

Teleoptik

In:

Out:

Bežanija

In:

Out:

Radnički Pirot

In:

Out:

Temnić

In:

Out:

Jagodina

In:

Out:

See also
Serbian SuperLiga
2017–18 Serbian SuperLiga
Serbian First League
2017–18 Serbian First League

References

Serbian SuperLiga
2017-18
transfers